St. Francis Xavier's Cathedral is the cathedral of the Roman Catholic Archdiocese of Bangalore in India. Initially, Bangalore was the seat of the diocese of Mysore from 1886 to 1940 and during this time, St. Patrick's church in Bangalore was the cathedral of the diocese. When the diocese of Mysore was bifurcated on 13 February 1940 to form the diocese of Bangalore, St. Francis Xavier's church was chosen as its cathedral.

The first church of St. Francis Xavier was constructed in 1851 by French missionaries of the Paris Foreign Missions Society. Due to the huge increase in the catholic population, this church eventually became inadequate. Hence in 1911, the foundation stone was laid for a new church. This church was inaugurated on 26 May 1932, which would become a cathedral in 1940. Two new domes of the facade were inaugurated on its platinum jubilee in the year 2009. Bangalore archbishop Bernard Moras re-dedicated the cathedral to St. Francis Xavier. The domes had been constructed along with several other renovations. Though they were part of the original plan of the cathedral, they could not be completed due to lack of funds.

The cathedral's large compound has three schools: St. Aloysius', St. Anthony's and St. Rock's. There is also a Shrine dedicated to St. Anthony.

References

External links
 GCatholic.org
 Blog post about the cathedral

Roman Catholic cathedrals in Karnataka
Roman Catholic churches in Bangalore
Church buildings with domes
Roman Catholic churches completed in 1932
20th-century Roman Catholic church buildings in India